Mariëtte "Jet" Bussemaker (born 15 January 1961) is a retired Dutch politician. A member of the Labour Party (PvdA), she served as Minister of Education, Culture and Science from 5 November 2012 to 26 October 2017 in the Second Rutte cabinet. She has been a professor of Science, Policy, Social Impact and Healthcare at Leiden University since 1 July 2018.

Biography

Early life

Mariëtte Bussemaker was born on 15 January 1961 in Capelle aan den IJssel in the province of South Holland as the daughter of Henk Bussemaker (1928–2018) and Elly Verduyn den Boer (1932–2017). Bussemaker attended primary and secondary education at the Rijnlands Lyceum in Oegstgeest. She subsequently studied at the University of Amsterdam, where she obtained a Bachelor of Social Science and a Master of Social Science cum laude in political science (specializing in Political philosophy). In 1993, Bussemaker received a Doctor of Philosophy degree in political and social-cultural sciences at the same university. Between 1993 and 1998 she was assistant professor of political science at the University of Amsterdam. She had been a member of the GreenLeft (GL) party during that period, but in 1995 she left it to join the Labour Party (PvdA) in 1997.

Political career
In the 1998 elections Bussemaker was elected into the House of Representatives. She specialized in employment policy, health care and taxes. In 2000 she was co-initiator of a proposal to allow conscientious objection for working on Sundays. This proposal became law in 2002. She remained assistant professor during her membership of the House of Representatives, now at the Vrije Universiteit Amsterdam.

After the election of 2006, Bussemaker was asked to become State Secretary for Health, Welfare and Sport in the Cabinet Balkenende IV. Bussemaker accepted and resigned as assistant professor the same day she took office as the new State Secretary for Health, Welfare and Sport on 22 February 2007. In May 2008, Bussemaker received strong criticism from MPs and fellow cabinet members after stating for the radio that she supported 2008 American Presidential candidate Barack Obama, and that she would consider the election of his Republican competitor John McCain to be a disaster. She did this in defiance of a ban on Cabinet members discussing foreign politics in a personal capacity, instituted earlier after Bussemaker's fellow Dutch Labour party member and Finance Minister Wouter Bos expressed a similar sympathy for Barack Obama. On 20 February 2010 the Cabinet Balkenende IV fell and Bussemaker and the rest of the Labour Party cabinet members resigned on 23 February 2010.

In January 2011 it was announced that Bussemaker would be part of the Board of the "Hogeschool Amsterdam" (that includes the International Business School and the Johan Cruyff University) and the University of Amsterdam,  (they share the same board), she would also be dean at the Hogeschool Amsterdam. In December 2011 Jet Bussemaker and the board received heavy criticism for apparently allowing or not being able to curb widespread diploma fraud at the Hogeschool van Amsterdam.

Bussemaker gave the 2013 Mosse Lecture, titled Grenzen aan homo-emancipatiebeleid: burgerwacht of politieagent? – Over de 'red lines' van het homo-emancipatiebeleid (Limits to gay emancipation policy: civilian or police officer? - About the 'red lines' of the gay emancipation policy).

Decorations

References

External links

Official
  Dr. M. (Jet) Bussemaker Parlement & Politiek

1961 births
Living people
Dutch academic administrators
Dutch education writers
Dutch political scientists
Dutch political philosophers
Dutch political writers
Dutch relationships and sexuality writers
Dutch women academics
Labour Party (Netherlands) politicians
Academic staff of Leiden University
Rectors of universities in the Netherlands
Members of the House of Representatives (Netherlands)
Members of the Royal Netherlands Academy of Arts and Sciences
Ministers of Education of the Netherlands
Officers of the Order of Orange-Nassau
Politicians from Amsterdam
People from Capelle aan den IJssel
People from Oegstgeest
State Secretaries for Health of the Netherlands
University of Amsterdam alumni
Academic staff of the University of Amsterdam
Academic staff of Vrije Universiteit Amsterdam
Women government ministers of the Netherlands
Women political scientists
20th-century Dutch educators
20th-century Dutch scientists
20th-century Dutch women politicians
20th-century Dutch politicians
20th-century Dutch women writers
21st-century Dutch educators
21st-century Dutch scientists
21st-century Dutch women politicians
21st-century Dutch politicians
21st-century Dutch women writers
20th-century women educators
21st-century women educators